Jens Cools (born 16 October 1990) is a Belgian professional footballer who plays as a defensive midfielder for Lierse. He gained two caps for the Belgium under-21 team.

Career

Westerlo
In the 2009–10 season, Cools was promoted from the youth academy to the first team of Westerlo, the club from the municipality where he grew up. He made his professional debut one season later. After having played for six seasons in the first team, Cools' contract expired at the end of the 2015–16 season, as a result of which he left Westerlo on a free transfer. A key player of the club during his time there, Cools managed to make 161 appearances for the club, in which he scored 12 goals.

Waasland-Beveren
On 1 July 2016, Cools moved Waasland-Beveren after having been convinced by their manager Stijn Vreven. Cools signed a two-year contract. He made 51 appearances for the club during his two seasons there, in which he scored two goals.

Pafos
After two seasons, he chose to accept an offer from Cypriot club Pafos. He experienced a strong season there in which he scored six goals in 25 appearances.

Eupen
After playing in Cyprus for one season, Cools expressed a wish to return to his home country. On 16 July 2019, Eupen announced that he had signed a three-year contract with them. In his first season there, he made 27 appearances and scored one goal.

In October 2020, he tested positive for SARS‑CoV‑2 during the COVID-19 pandemic. Despite being sidelined for some time with the disease, Cools made 26 appearances and scored one goal during the 2020–21 season, as Eupen finished mid-table in a disappointing 12th place.

Al-Riyadh
On 26 July 2022, Cools joined Saudi Arabian club Al-Riyadh.

Lierse
On 7 January 2023, Cools signed a year-and-a-half contract with Lierse.

International career
Cools was called into the Belgian under-21 squad in March 2011. He made his debut for the Belgium under-21s on 24 March, replacing Luis Pedro Cavanda in the 82nd minute of a 1–0 win against Scotland.

Career statistics

Club

References

External links

1990 births
People from Westerlo
Footballers from Antwerp Province
Living people
Association football midfielders
Belgian footballers
Belgium under-21 international footballers
K.V.C. Westerlo players
S.K. Beveren players
Pafos FC players
K.A.S. Eupen players
Al-Riyadh SC players
Lierse Kempenzonen players
Belgian Pro League players
Challenger Pro League players
Belgian expatriate footballers
Expatriate footballers in Cyprus
Belgian expatriate sportspeople in Cyprus
Expatriate footballers in Saudi Arabia
Belgian expatriate sportspeople in Saudi Arabia